Liangshan may refer to the following places in China and Korea:

 Liangshan Yi Autonomous Prefecture (凉山彝族自治州), Sichuan
 Liangshan County (梁山县), Shandong
 Mount Liang (梁山), a mountain in Shandong, well known for Water Margin
 Liangping County, Chongqing, formerly Liangshan County, Sichuan
 Liangshan, Jiangxi (良山镇), town in Yushui District, Xinyu
 Liangshan, Liaoning (梁山镇), town in Xinmin, Liaoning
 Liangshan, Shaanxi (梁山镇), town in Qian County
 Liangshan, Shandong (梁山镇), town in and seat of Liangshan County
 Yangsan(梁山市), South Gyeongsang Province